Agent 077 From the Orient With Fury or Agent 077 Fury in the Orient or Agente 077 dall'oriente con furore or Fury on the Bosphorus is a 1965 Italian/Spanish/French international co-production action spy adventure film and the second of the Secret Agent 077 film series directed by Sergio Grieco.

A Eurospy film, inspired by the James Bond series, it involves a scientist who has invented a disintegrator gun capable of mass destruction being kidnapped by a criminal gang for lethal usage.

Cast
 Ken Clark - Agent 077 Dick Malloy (Jack Cliffton in the German version)
 Margaret Lee as Evelyn Stone
 Evi Marandi as Romy Kurtz, Prof. Kurtz' daughter
 Fabienne Dali as Simone Degas
 Philippe Hersent as Heston - Europachef CIA
 Mikaela as Dolores Lopez (as Michaela)
 Fernando Sancho as Restaurant guest
 Loris Bazzocchi (as Loris Barton)
 Ennio Balbo as Professor Kurtz
 Claudio Ruffini as Goldwyn's blond puncher
 Franco Ressel as Goldwyn (as Frank Ressel)
 Tomás Blanco as Auctioneer
 Pasquale Basile (as Pat Basil)
 Lorenzo Robledo as Mike (as Norman Preston)
 Gianni Medici (as John Hamilton)
 Jean Yonnel (as Jean Lyonel)

References

External links 
 
 YouTube

1965 films
French spy films
Spanish spy films
1960s Italian-language films
1960s action adventure films
1960s spy thriller films
Italian spy thriller films
Films directed by Sergio Grieco
Italian action adventure films
Films scored by Piero Piccioni
Films shot in Scotland
Films set on trains
Films shot in Paris
Films shot in Istanbul
Films shot in Madrid
Parody films based on James Bond films
1960s Italian films
1960s French films